The 1959–60 season was the 55th season of competitive football in Turkey.

Overview
Beşiktaş were crowned champions for the first time. The club recorded eleven wins by a 1–0 result. Fenerbahçe finished second, while Galatasaray placed third. Baraj Maçları (Baraj Matches) were created to decide who would be relegated and who would be promoted. The bottom three teams from the Milli Lig faced off against the winning teams from the Adana, Ankara, Istanbul, and İzmir leagues. Altınordu were the only club to stay in the Milli Lig, while Hacettepe and Adalet were relegated to the Ankara and Istanbul leagues respectively.

In Europe, Fenerbahçe took part in the 1959–60 European Cup. They were knocked out by OGC Nice in the first round after losing out in the play-off match. Beşiktaş qualified for the 1960–61 European Cup after winning the 1959–60 Milli Lig.

Honours

Notes – Number in parentheses is the times that club has won that honour.

Awards
Gol Kralı (Goal King)
Metin Oktay (Galatasaray) – 33 goals

Final league table

Baraj Maçları

Clubs in Europe
Fenerbahçe qualified for the 1959–60 European Cup after winning the 1959 Milli Lig. The club took part in the preliminary round, beating Hungarian side Csepel SC 4–3 on aggregate. The club progressed to the first round, where they met French club OGC Nice. Both clubs drew 3–3 on aggregate. An extra play-off match was needed to decide who would advance. Fenerbahçe went on to lose the play-off match 1–5.

Preliminary round

First round

Play-off

National team
The Turkey national football team took part in a single friendly during the 1959–60. They defeated Scotland 4–2, with Lefter Küçükandonyadis netting two goals.

References